National Youth League may refer to:

Politics
 National Youth League (Indian National League), youth section of the Indian National League political party
 National League of Sweden, also known as the National Youth League of Sweden

Sport
 Gillette National Youth League, a British rugby league football competition
 National Youth Competition (rugby league), an Australasian rugby league football competition
 The former name of the Y-League, an Australian soccer competition
 National Youth League (Scotland), a rugby league competition
 National Youth League (New Zealand), a football (soccer) competition